Fernando Eugénio Pacheco Mamede, ComM (born 1 November 1951) is a former Portuguese athlete, a long distance running specialist. He was born in Beja. Together with Carlos Lopes, he is one of the best Portuguese male long distance runners ever, and held the 10,000 metres world record (1984-1989) with a time of 27:13.81 until bettered by Arturo Barrios of Mexico. He also competed at three Olympic Games. However, he never won any high-level competition as he dealt very badly with pressure.

In the European and World Athletics Championships and Olympics where he competed between 1971 and 1984, he either was eliminated from the finals, placed outside the top ten runners in them or dropped out of the final. In the 1983 World Championships in Athletics and the 1984 Los Angeles Olympics, he ran excellently in the 10,000-metre qualifying heats, but he placed 14th in the World Championships final and failed to finish in the Olympic final.

He remains one of fastest Europeans of all time in the 10,000 metres.

Mamede also competed in cross country running, taking part in the IAAF World Cross Country Championships eleven times. His cross country career was highlighted by a bronze medal at the 1981 IAAF World Cross Country Championships and two wins at the Cross Internacional de Itálica.

References

External links

1951 births
Living people
People from Beja, Portugal
Portuguese male long-distance runners
Athletes (track and field) at the 1972 Summer Olympics
Athletes (track and field) at the 1976 Summer Olympics
Athletes (track and field) at the 1984 Summer Olympics
Olympic athletes of Portugal
World record setters in athletics (track and field)
Sportspeople from Beja District